Ilija "Ilcho" Gjorgjioski (born 11 December 1971) is a North Macedonia football manager and former player who played as a midfielder. He is the current manager of Kalamata in the Super League Greece 2.

President of Football Federation of North Macedonia
In 2012 Gjorgjioski was appointment position of President of FFM.

Death of Petar Miloševski
Former national team goalkeeper Petar Miloševski died in a car accident near Kumanovo on 13 March 2014 after taking part in a charity futsal match there. Reportedly the car in which he was travelling was driven by Gjorgioski and collided with a van from the opposite direction for unknown reasons on the Kriva Palanka-Kumanovo road. Gjorgioski and an unknown person came out injured.

Achievements
As Coach
FK Makedonija Gjorce Petrov
North Macedonian Cup: 1 (with youth team)
Winner: 2003-04
First Macedonian Football League: 1
Winner: 2008-09
Macedonian Cup:
Runner-up: 2008-09
FK Vardar
First North Macedonian Football League: 1
Winner: 2011-12

References

1971 births
Living people
Footballers from Skopje
Association football midfielders
Macedonian footballers
FK Makedonija Gjorče Petrov players
FK Vardar players
Denizlispor footballers
FK Sloga Jugomagnat players
Macedonian First Football League players
Süper Lig players
Macedonian expatriate footballers
Expatriate footballers in Turkey
Macedonian expatriate sportspeople in Turkey
Macedonian football managers
FK Makedonija Gjorče Petrov managers
FK Vardar managers
Association football chairmen and investors
North Macedonia international footballers